Interleukin-1 alpha (IL-1 alpha) also known as hematopoietin 1 is a cytokine of the interleukin 1 family that in humans is encoded by the IL1A gene. In general, Interleukin 1 is responsible for the production of inflammation, as well as the promotion of fever and sepsis. IL-1α inhibitors are being developed to interrupt those processes and treat diseases.

IL-1α is produced mainly by activated macrophages, as well as neutrophils, epithelial cells, and endothelial cells. It possesses metabolic, physiological, haematopoietic activities, and plays one of the central roles in the regulation of the immune responses. It binds to the interleukin-1 receptor. It is on the pathway that activates tumor necrosis factor-alpha.

Discovery 

Interleukin 1 was discovered by Gery in 1972. He named it lymphocyte-activating factor (LAF) because it was a lymphocyte mitogen. It was not until 1985 that interleukin 1 was discovered to consist of two distinct proteins, now called interleukin-1 alpha and interleukin-1 beta.

Alternative names 

IL-1α is also known as fibroblast-activating factor (FAF), lymphocyte-activating factor (LAF), B-cell-activating factor (BAF), leukocyte endogenous mediator (LEM), epidermal cell-derived thymocyte-activating factor (ETAF), serum amyloid A inducer or hepatocyte-stimulating factor (HSP), catabolin, hemopoetin-1 (H-1), endogenous pyrogen (EP), and proteolysis-inducing factor (PIF).

Synthesis and structure 

IL-1α is a unique member in the cytokine family in the sense that the structure of its initially synthesized precursor does not contain a signal peptide fragment (same is known for IL-1β and IL-18). After processing by the removal of N-terminal amino acids by specific proteases, the resulting peptide is called "mature" form. Calpain, a calcium-activated cysteine protease, associated with the plasma membrane, is primarily responsible for the cleavage of the IL-1α precursor into a mature molecule. Both  the 31kDa precursor form of IL-1α and its 18kDa mature form are biologically active.

The 31 kDa IL-1α precursor is synthesized in association with cytoskeletal structures (microtubules), unlike most secreted proteins, which are translated on ribosomes associated with rough endoplasmic reticulum.

The three-dimensional structure of the IL-1α contains an open-ended barrel composed entirely of beta-pleated strands. Crystal structure analysis of the mature form of IL-1α shows that it has two sites of binding to IL-1 receptor. There is a primary binding site located at the open top of its barrel, which is similar but not identical to that of IL-1β.

Production and cellular sources 

IL-1α is constitutively produced by epithelial cells. It is found in substantial amounts in normal human epidermis and is distributed in a 1:1 ratio between living epidermal cells and stratum corneum. The constitutive production of large amounts of IL-1α precursor by healthy epidermal keratinocytes interfere with the important role of IL-1α in immune responses, assuming skin as a barrier, which prevents the entry of pathogenic microorganisms into the body.

The essential role of IL-1α in maintenance of skin barrier function, especially with increasing age, is an additional explanation of IL-1α constitutive production in epidermis.

With the exception of skin keratinocytes, some epithelial cells and certain cells in central nervous system, the mRNA coding for IL-1α (and, thus, IL-1α itself) is not observed in health in most of cell types, tissues, and blood, in spite of wide physiological, metabolic, haematopoietic, and immunological IL-1α activities.

A wide variety of other cells only upon stimulation can be induced to transcribe the IL-1α genes and produce the precursor form of IL-1α, Among them are fibroblasts, macrophages, granulocytes, eosinophils, mast cells and basophils, endothelial cells, platelets, monocytes and myeloid cell lines, blood T-lymphocytes and B-lymphocytes, astrocytes, kidney mesangial cells, Langerhans cells, dermal dendritic cells, natural killer cells, large granular lymphocytes, microglia, blood neutrophils, lymph node cells, maternal placental cells and several other cell types.

IL1A is found on the surface of senescent cells, where it contributes to the production of senescence-associated secretory phenotype (SASP) factors.

These data suggest that IL-1α is normally an epidermal cytokine.

Interactions

IL1A has been shown to interact with HAX1, and NDN.

Although there are many interactions of IL-1α with other cytokines, the most consistent and most clinically relevant is its synergism with TNF. IL-1α and TNF are both acute-phase cytokines that act to promote fever and inflammation.  There are, in fact, few examples in which the synergism between IL-1α and TNFα has not been demonstrated. These include radioprotection, the Shwartzman reaction, PGE2 synthesis, sickness behavior, nitric oxide production, nerve growth factor synthesis, insulin resistance, loss of mean body mass, and IL-8 and chemokine synthesis.

Translation of mRNA for IL1A is highly dependent upon mTOR activity. IL1A and NF-κB mutually induce each other in a positive feedback loop.

Regulatory molecules 

The most important regulatory molecule for IL-1α activity is IL-1Ra, which is usually produced in a 10- to 100-fold molar excess. In addition, the soluble form of the IL-1R type I has a high affinity for IL-1α and is produced in a 5-10 molar excess. IL-10 also inhibits IL-1α synthesis.

Biological activity

In vitro 

IL-1α possesses biological effect on cells in the picomolar to femtomolar range. In particular, IL-1α:
 stimulates keratinocytes and macrophages for induced IL-1α secretion
 induces pro-collagen type I and III synthesis
 causes proliferation of fibroblasts, induces collagenase secretion, induces cytoskeletal rearrangements, induces IL-6 and GCSF secretion
 induces cycloxygenase synthesis and prostaglandin PGE2 release
 causes phosphorylation of heat shock protein
 causes proliferation of smooth muscle cells, keratinocytes and stimulates release of other cytokines by keratinocytes
 induces TNFα release by endothelial cells and Ca2+ release from osteoclasts.
 stimulates hepatocytes for secretion of acute-phase proteins
 induces proliferation of CD4+ cells, IL-2 production, co-stimulates CD8+/IL-1R+ cells, induces proliferation of mature B-cells and immunoglobulin secretion
 kills a limited number of tumor cells types

In vivo 

Shortly after an onset of an infection into organism, IL-1α activates a set of immune system response processes. In particular, IL-1α: 
 stimulates fibroblasts proliferation
 induces synthesis of proteases, subsequent muscle proteolysis, release of all types of amino acids in blood and stimulates acute-phase proteins synthesis
 changes the metallic ion content of blood plasma by increasing copper and decreasing zinc and iron concentration in blood
 induces production of SASP factors by senescent cells as a result of mTOR activity
 increases blood neutrophils
 activates lymphocyte proliferation and induces fever

Topically administered IL-1α also stimulates expression of FGF and EGF, and subsequent fibroblasts and keratinocytes proliferation. This, plus the presence of large depot of IL-1α precursor in keratinocytes, suggests that locally released IL-1α may play an important role and accelerate wound healing.

IL-1α is known to protect against lethal doses of γ-irradiation in mice,  possibly as a result of hemopoietin-1 activity.

Applications

Pharmaceutical 

Clinical trials on IL-1α have been carried out that are specifically designed to mimic the protective studies in animals. IL-1α has been administered to patients during receiving autologous bone marrow transplantation. The treatment with 50 ng/kg IL-1α from day zero of autologous bone marrow or stem cells transfer resulted in an earlier recovery of thrombocytopenia compared with historical controls.  IL-1α is currently being evaluated in clinical trials as a potential therapeutic in oncology indications.

An anti-IL-1α therapeutic antibody, MABp1, is being tested in clinical trials for anti-neoplastic activity in solid tumors.  Blocking the activity of  IL-1α has the potential to treat skin diseases such as acne.

References

Further reading

External links 
 

Interleukins

pl:Interleukina 1